In a Big Flash Car on a Saturday Night is a solo album by the former Carter USM singer/guitarist Jim Bob, released with the "Jim's Super Stereoworld" nickname n 2002. A fellow Carter USM member, Fruitbat, is credited in the album's liner notes as shouting on "Big Flash Car" and "Heads Will Rock".

Critical reception
AllMusic called the album "alternately infectious, tasteless, full of grace, and spectacularly absurd". Drowned in Sound wrote that "like all things pop, it is designed to be disposable, almost transparent, yet produced with immaculate care and of hidden depths".

Track listing
 Heads Will Rock
 Young Dumb (And Full Of Fun)
 Big Flash Car
 Jim's Mobile Disco
 Hey Kenny
 Mission Control
 Candy Floss
 Tight Pants
 Happier Times

Personnel
Jim Bob
Fruitbat, on some tracks

References

2001 albums
Jim Bob albums